The 2018 Nevada Attorney General election took place on November 6, 2018, to elect the attorney general of Nevada.

Incumbent Republican Attorney General Adam Laxalt did not run for re-election to a second term and instead ran unsuccessfully for governor. Nevada Senate Majority Leader Aaron Ford won the Democratic nomination and defeated Republican nominee and former Nevada Assembly member Wesley Duncan in the general election.

Republican primary 
Duncan won the Republican primary, defeating attorney Craig Mueller.

Democratic primary 
Ford won the Democratic primary, defeating attorney Stuart MacKie.

General election 
Ford won the election by a 0.47% margin.

See also 

 2018 United States attorney general elections
 2018 Nevada elections

References 

Nevada
Attorney General
Nevada Attorney General elections